"Me Extraño" (English: "I Miss Myself") is a song by American singer Romeo Santos and Mexican singer Christian Nodal. It is the fifth single for Santos' fifth studio album Formula, Vol. 3 (2022). The music video was released on October 13, 2022.

Charts

Certifications

References

2022 singles
2022 songs
Romeo Santos songs
Christian Nodal songs
Sony Music Latin singles
Songs written by Romeo Santos
Regional Mexican songs
Spanish-language songs